Duets is an album by trumpeter Dizzy Gillespie featuring Sonny Rollins and Sonny Stitt, recorded in 1957 and released on the Verve label.  The recordings on this album are from the same sessions and with the same personnel that produced the Sonny Side Up album which had Sonny Stitt and Sonny Rollins playing simultaneously with Dizzy Gillespie.  On the Duets album, as the name implies, Sonny Stitt and Sonny Rollins played separately with Dizzy Gillespie.

Reception
The AllMusic review states that "the highlights are many."

Track listing
All compositions by Dizzy Gillespie
 "Wheatleigh Hall"8:48 
 "Sumphin10:26 
 "Con Alma" [alternate take]9:08 Bonus track on CD reissue 
 "Con Alma"9:26 
 "Anythin10:29 Bonus track on CD reissue  
 "Haute Mon10:38

Personnel
Dizzy Gillespietrumpet
Sonny Stitttenor saxophone (tracks 3, 4, & 6), alto saxophone (track 5) 
Sonny Rollinstenor saxophone (tracks 1 & 2)
Ray Bryantpiano
Tommy Bryantbass
Charlie Persipdrums

References 

Dizzy Gillespie albums
1958 albums
Verve Records albums
Albums produced by Norman Granz